This is a list of scientific demonstrations used in educational demonstrations and popular science lectures.

Physics 
 Balsa wood bridge — demonstrates compressive strength and tensile strength, teaches engineering thinking
 Egg drop competition — demonstrates compressive strength, teaches engineering thinking
 Hand boiler — demonstrates vapour-liquid equilibrium and simple heat engine principles
 Newton's cradle — demonstrates elastic collision, conservation of momentum, and conservation of energy
 Plate trick or Dirac belt trick —  demonstrates spinors and the double cover of SO(3) by SU(2)
 Prince Rupert's Drop  — demonstrates supercooling and tensile stress
 Self-siphoning beads — demonstrates momentum, energy and inertia
 Water rocket — demonstrates conservation of momentum, conservation of energy, the gas laws and basic rocketry
 Franklin bells — demonstrate electric charges
 Oxford Electric Bell — an experimental electric bell that was set up in 1840 and which has run nearly continuously ever since
 Wimshurst machine — an electrostatic generator

Chemistry 
 Ammonia fountain — introduces concepts like solubility and the gas laws at entry level.
 Barking dog reaction — demonstrates rapid exothermic chemical reaction
 Blue bottle (chemical reaction) — demonstrates reduction and oxidation reactions, and chemical colour change
 Chemical garden 
 Diet Coke and Mentos eruption
 Dry ice color show
 Elephant toothpaste
 Fizz keeper
 Flame test
 Magic sand
 Mercury beating heart — demonstrates electrochemical redox reaction. and an effect of a non-homogeneous electrical double layer
 Screaming jelly babies

Miscellaneous 
 Al-Biruni's reaction time
 Alhazen's camera obscura, lamp experiment and magnifying lens
 Al-Jazari's crankshaft, elephant clock and programmable robots
 Avenzoar's parasites
 Detonating a cloud of flour
 Foucault's pendulum
 Galileo Galilei's ball experiments, pendulum and telescope
 Heron's fountain and aeolipile
 Ibn al-Nafis' pulmonary circulation and coronary circulation
 Gyroscopic bicycle wheel
 Shooting a candle through a plank
 Taqi al-Din's alarm clock, steam turbine
 Using a linear motor as a gun
 Using liquid nitrogen to shatter a rose
 William Harvey's circulatory system

Science-related lists